Bailey is an unincorporated community in Jefferson County, in the U.S. state of Missouri.

History
Variant names were "Bailey Station" and "Hanover". A post office called Bailey's Station was established in 1861, the name was changed to Hanover in 1864, and the post office closed in 1885. The present name honors John Martin Bailey, an early settler.

References

Unincorporated communities in Jefferson County, Missouri
Unincorporated communities in Missouri